The 1977 season of the Venezuelan Primera División, the top category of Venezuelan football, was played by 12 teams. The national champions were Portuguesa.

Results

First stage

Sixth Place Playoff

Final Stage

Title Playoff

External links
Venezuela 1977 season at RSSSF

Ven
Venezuelan Primera División seasons
Prim